Cynthia Green (born 10 September 1960) is a Jamaican sprinter. She competed in the women's 400 metres at the 1984 Summer Olympics.

References

External links
 

1960 births
Living people
Athletes (track and field) at the 1984 Summer Olympics
Jamaican female sprinters
Olympic athletes of Jamaica
Place of birth missing (living people)
Olympic female sprinters
20th-century Jamaican women